The 90th Division(2nd Formation) was created in October 1950 basing on the 15th Security Brigade of Huadong Military Region.

In June 1952 the division was inactivated and reorganized as 1st Hydraulic Engineering Construction Division.

As of inactivation the division was composed of:
268th Regiment;
269th Regiment;
270th Regiment.

References

中国人民解放军各步兵师沿革，http://blog.sina.com.cn/s/blog_a3f74a990101cp1q.html

Infantry divisions of the People's Liberation Army
Military units and formations established in 1950
Military units and formations disestablished in 1952